The Thunderbird Classic is a defunct WTA Tour affiliated tennis tournament played from 1971 to 1980.  It was held in Phoenix, Arizona in the United States and played on indoor hard courts in 1971 and 1976 and outdoor hard courts from 1972 to 1975 and 1977 to 1980.

Results

Singles

Doubles

See also
 Virginia Slims of Arizona

References
WTA Tour history

External links

Defunct tennis tournaments in the United States
Hard court tennis tournaments
Indoor tennis tournaments
Recurring sporting events disestablished in 1980
Recurring sporting events established in 1971
Sports in Phoenix, Arizona
Virginia Slims tennis tournaments
WTA Tour
1971 establishments in Arizona
1980 disestablishments in Arizona
Women's sports in Arizona